Poecilorchestes decoratus is a jumping spider species in the genus Poecilorchestes that lives in the New Guinea. The male of the species was first identified by Eugène Simon in 1901.

References

Arthropods of New Guinea
Spiders of Asia
Salticidae
Taxa named by Eugène Simon
Spiders described in 1901